Harl McDonald (July 27, 1899 - March 30, 1955) was an American composer, conductor, pianist and teacher. McDonald was born in Boulder, Colorado, and studied at the University of California, Berkeley, the University of Redlands, and the Leipzig Conservatory. He was appointed a lecturer at the University of Pennsylvania in 1927 and enjoyed other appointments at the University including the Director of the Music Department and Director of the University's Choral Society and the University of Pennsylvania Glee Club. Among his students there was Ann Wyeth McCoy. In addition to his administrative duties with the University, McDonald composed numerous musical works and served on the board of directors of the Philadelphia Orchestra Association. He died in Princeton, New Jersey due to a stroke at the age of 55 while helping to direct the production of a motion picture film on orchestral music.

His four symphonies are subtitled "The Santa Fe Trail" (#1 - 1933), "The Rhumba" (#2 - 1934), "Lamentations of Fu Hsuan" (#3 - 1935) and "Festival of the Workers" (#4 - 1937). His other works include a concerto for two pianos, two piano trios, and choral music. His 1938 Lament for the Stolen, for women's chorus and orchestra, was written in commemoration of the Lindbergh kidnapping.

External links 
 Guide to the Harl McDonald Recordings, 1937 - 1944 at the University of Pennsylvania
 Grove Music Online 
"Terrible Thing", Time review of McDonald's Lament for the Stolen, Jan. 9, 1939.

References 

1899 births
1955 deaths
American male composers
American male conductors (music)
American classical pianists
Male classical pianists
American male pianists
University of California, Berkeley alumni
University of Redlands alumni
University of Music and Theatre Leipzig alumni
University of Pennsylvania faculty
Musicians from Boulder, Colorado
20th-century American conductors (music)
20th-century American composers
20th-century classical pianists
20th-century American pianists
20th-century American male musicians